Ignacy Chrzanowski (5 February 1866 in Stok – 19 January 1940) was a Polish historian of literature, professor of the Jagiellonian University, arrested by the Nazis as part of the Sonderaktion Krakau and killed in the Sachsenhausen concentration camp.

His daughter was Hanna Helena Chrzanowska.

References

1866 births
1940 deaths
Academic staff of Jagiellonian University
Polish literary historians
People who died in Sachsenhausen concentration camp
Commanders of the Order of Polonia Restituta
Polish people executed in Nazi concentration camps
Polish people executed abroad
People from Radzyń Podlaski County
Executed people from Lublin Voivodeship
Members of the Lwów Scientific Society
Recipients of the Order of Polonia Restituta
Burials at Rakowicki Cemetery